The 1998 Argentine Grand Prix (formally the XXI Gran Premio Marlboro Argentina) was a Formula One motor race held at Autódromo Oscar Alfredo Gálvez, Buenos Aires, on 12 April 1998. The race is (to date) the last Argentine Grand Prix. It was the third race of the 1998 FIA Formula One World Championship. The 72-lap race was won by Michael Schumacher for the Ferrari team, from a second position start. Mika Häkkinen finished second in a McLaren, with Eddie Irvine third in the other Ferrari car.

Race summary
The two Saubers collided en route to the grid. At the start of the race, Michael Schumacher was caught out by Mika Häkkinen, while David Coulthard maintained his first place. Schumacher passed Häkkinen at the start of the second lap. On the same lap Eddie Irvine overtook Heinz-Harald Frentzen. By lap 4, Schumacher caught up with Coulthard, and on the next lap the Scotsman took the wrong line, and Schumacher went past. The two cars touched, and Coulthard slid off the track, and rejoined in sixth place. The race then became one between Schumacher, stopping twice, and Häkkinen, on a one-stop strategy. Schumacher's plan proved to be the right one, as he emerged in front following his second stop, after Häkkinen lost time behind Heinz-Harald Frentzen. Behind Häkkinen and the two Ferraris, Jacques Villeneuve was under attack from Jean Alesi and Coulthard. When Esteban Tuero came into the pits, one of his tyres was missing. Eventually, one of the mechanics found it in the garage. Coulthard was slowed by gearbox problems and lost further ground when he tangled with Jacques Villeneuve, putting the Canadian out, while the Scot collected the solitary point for sixth place behind Häkkinen, Eddie Irvine, Alexander Wurz, and Sauber's Jean Alesi. In the lead, Schumacher collected the victory.

Classification

Qualifying

Race

Championship standings after the race

Drivers'     Championship standings

Constructors'     Championship standings

 Note:     Only the top five positions are included for both sets of standings.

References 

Argentine Grand Prix
Argentine Grand Prix
Grand Prix
Argentine Grand Prix